NH 151 may refer to:

 National Highway 151 (India)
 New Hampshire Route 151, United States